Felix Tretter (born in 1949 in Villach, Austria) is an Austrian psychologist and psychiatrist. From 1992 to 2014 he was head of the addiction department of the Isar-Amper-Klinikum München-Ost, formerly known as Bezirkskrankenhaus Haar, Bavaria, Germany. His scientific work has emphasis on modelling of psychophysical scenarios in schizophrenia and addiction research with methods of systems science.

Biography 
Felix Tretter graduated in philosophy, psychology, medicine, statistics, sociology, and economics at the universities of Vienna and Munich. Subsequently, he worked as a scholar at the Max-Planck Institute for Psychiatry in Munich. After earning doctorates as Dr. phil., Dr. med. and Dr. rer. pol. he habilitated to qualify as a professor in clinical psychology at the Ludwig-Maximilian University Munich. Additionally, he was for several years involved in the constitution of environmental medicine in Germany.

Board-certified for neurology, psychiatry, and psychotherapy he was appointed the head of the addiction department of the Bezirkskrankenhaus Haar, a tertiary psychiatric hospital in the east of Munich. He held this position up to his retirement in 2014.

Felix Tretter is deputy head of the Bavarian Academy for Addiction and Health Issues (Bayerische Akademie für Sucht- und Gesundheitsfragen). Since 2015 he is fellow at the Bertalanffy Center for the Study of Systems Science (BCSSS) in Vienna.

Scientific work 

Tretter wrote research papers, review articles, and books. The main focus of his scientific work is mathematical description of neuropsychological mechanisms in the evolution of schizophrenia and addiction.  He aims at describing psychosocial problems from a cybernetics and systems perspective. Additional publications by Tretter include systems biology and theory of medicine applied to different fields, including COVID-19.

Selected publications

Books 
 Tretter, F. Ökologie der Sucht. Hogrefe Verlag 1998. 
 Tretter, F. Systemtheorie im klinischen Kontext. Pabst, Lengerich 2005 
 Tretter, F. Ökologie der Person. Pabst, Lengerich 2008, 
 Tretter, F., Grünhut, C. Ist das Gehirn der Geist? Grundfragen der Neurophysiologie. Hogrefe, Göttingen, 2010. 
 Tretter, F. Sucht. Gehirn. Gesellschaft. Medizinisch Wissenchaftliche Verlagsgesellschaft, Berlin 2016. 
 Tretter, F. (Editor) Suchtmedizin kompakt. Schattauer, Stuttgart 2008, 2012 und 2017. .
 Tretter, F., Winterer, G., (Editor), Gebicke-Haerter, P. J., Mendoza, E. R. (Editors) Systems Biology in Psychiatric Research: From High-Throughput Data to Mathematical Modeling. Wiley-Blackwell 2010

Selected research papers and review articles

References

External links 
 Tretter's homepage
 Author's portrait at the Medizinisch-Wissenschaftliche Verlagsgesellschaft

1949 births
People from Villach
Austrian psychiatrists
Austrian neurologists
Cyberneticists
Living people
Austrian scientists
Ludwig Maximilian University of Munich alumni
University of Vienna alumni